Bufonaria crumena is a species of sea snail, a marine gastropod mollusk in the family Bursidae, the frog shells.

Distribution
This species occurs in the Indian Ocean off Tanzania, Mozambique, Madagascar and the Mascarene Basin.

References

 Dautzenberg, Ph. (1929). Contribution à l'étude de la faune de Madagascar: Mollusca marina testacea. Faune des colonies françaises, III(fasc. 4). Société d'Editions géographiques, maritimes et coloniales: Paris. 321-636, plates IV-VII pp
 Drivas, J. & M. Jay (1988). Coquillages de La Réunion et de l'île Maurice 
 Steyn, D.G. & Lussi, M. (1998) Marine Shells of South Africa. An Illustrated Collector’s Guide to Beached Shells. Ekogilde Publishers, Hartebeespoort, South Africa, ii + 264 pp. page(s): 72

Bursidae
Gastropods described in 1816